ZTF J153932.16+502738.8 is a double binary white dwarf with an orbital period of just 6.91 minutes. Its period has been observed to be decreasing, due to the emission of gravitational waves. It is both an eclipsing binary and a double-lined spectroscopic binary. The stars may merge into one in 130,000 years, or if mass transfers between them, they may separate again.

Stars
Its radius is 0.0156 that of the Sun. The dimmer star is cooler, with a temperature of under , and has a mass 0.21 that of the Sun. It is physically larger than the brighter star at 0.0314 the radius of the Sun.

Name
ZTF stands for Zwicky Transient Facility. This is a survey of the whole northern sky recording light curves that uses Samuel Oschin Telescope at Palomar Observatory.

Eclipse
The light curve shows eclipses. One dip in the light curve is 15%, and the other is close to 100%. This means that one star is much brighter than the other. The light curve is not flat between eclipses, as the bright star is lighting up the face of the dim star.

Orbital decay
The orbital period is decreasing at  seconds per second giving a characteristic timescale of 210,000 years. This decay is mostly due to the emission of gravitational waves, however 7% of the decay could be due to tidal losses. The decay is predicted to go for 130,000 years when the orbital period should reach 5 minutes. Then the dimmer star is predicted to expand and lose mass to the more massive star. It could then become an AM CVn system or merge to make a R Coronae Borealis star.

The orbit compares with V407 Vulpeculae with a 9.5 minute orbit, and HM Cancri with 5.4 minute orbit.

Star composition
The hot star is a hydrogen-rich white dwarf of type DA. It has wide and shallow absorption lines of hydrogen. The dim star has narrow hydrogen emission lines, showing it is cooler. There are also helium absorption and emission lines. The two kinds of lines vary over the period, so that they can be identified with the two components. The emission lines are likely due to excess heating of the dim star by the bright one.

References

Spectroscopic binaries
White dwarfs
Gravitational-wave astronomy
Boötes
Eclipsing binaries